The 2011 WAFL season was the 127th season of the West Australian Football League and its various incarnations. The season opened on 19 March, with  defeating  by 15 points at Steel Blue Oval, and concluded with the 2011 WAFL Grand Final, with  defeating  by 56 points. The top three teams – Claremont, Subiaco and  – qualified for the 2012 Foxtel Cup.

Rule changes
The WAFL implemented two rule changes for the 2011 season, to conform with similar rules changes in the Australian Football League (AFL):
 The advantage rule was altered to put the onus on the player rather than the umpire to decide whether they can take the advantage from a free kick.
 The rough conduct rule was altered to make any player who makes forceful contact to the head of another player while bumping is liable to suspension, unless the player was (a) contesting the ball and did not have a reasonable alternative way to contest the ball or (b) the contact was caused by circumstances outside the control of the player that could not reasonably be foreseen.

Clubs

Season

Round 1

Round 2

Round 3

Round 4

Round 5

Round 6 (Anzac Day)

Round 7

Round 8

Round 9

Round 10

Round 11

Round 12 (Foundation Day)

Round 13

State game

Round 14

Round 15

Round 16

Round 17

Round 18

Round 19

Round 20

Round 21

Round 22

Round 23

Round 24

Finals series

Semi-finals

Preliminary final

Grand Final

Ladder

References

West Australian Football League seasons
WAFL